Bad Creek is a stream in the U.S. state of Georgia. It is a tributary to the Chattooga River.

Bad Creek was so named on account of rough terrain along its course.

References

Rivers of Georgia (U.S. state)
Rivers of Rabun County, Georgia